Nezir Karap (born 2 January 1994) is a Turkish swimmer competing in the freestyle stroke event. He was a member of Galatasaray Swimming before he transferred to Enkaspor.

He won the silver medal in the 200 m freestyle, the bronze medal in the 400 m freestyle, the bronze medal in the 800 m freestyle, the gold medal in the 4 × 100 m freestyle relay and the silver medal in the 4 × 200 m freestyle relay event of the Aquatics at the 2013 Islamic Solidarity Games in Palembang, Indonesia.

Karap took the bronze medal in the 4 × 200 m freestyle relay event
at the 2013 Mediterranean Games in Mersin, Turkey.

He holds a number of national records including in 400m freestyle (3:50.07 in 2015), 800m freestyle (7:59.20 in 2016), 1500m freestyle (15:16.29 in 2016), and 4 × 200 m freestyle relay (7:22.15 in 2015).

He earned a quota spot for the 2016 Summer Olympics with his performance in the 400m freestyle event at the 2015 World Aquatics Championships in Kazan, Russia. His time was also a new national record.

References

1994 births
Sportspeople from Istanbul
Turkish male freestyle swimmers
Enkaspor athletes
Living people
Swimmers at the 2016 Summer Olympics
Olympic swimmers of Turkey
Mediterranean Games bronze medalists for Turkey
Swimmers at the 2013 Mediterranean Games
Swimmers at the 2018 Mediterranean Games
Mediterranean Games medalists in swimming
Islamic Solidarity Games medalists in swimming
Islamic Solidarity Games competitors for Turkey
21st-century Turkish people